Lucídio Vimaranes (died ) was the second count of Portugal within the Kingdom of Asturias, which was divided internally into several provinces called "counties". Portus Cale was one of these counties which was incorporated in the Kingdom as a new land conquered from the moors. Although Lucídio's parentage is not confirmed in any source, all historians agree that based on his uncommon patronymic, he was most probably the son of Vímara Peres.  Upon the death of his father, King Alfonso III of Asturias entrusted him with the government of the county jointly with Count Hermenegildo Gutiérrez who was succeeded by his son Gutier Menéndez.  In the 11th-century, his great-grandson Count Alvito Nunes, initiated a second period in which the family governed the County of Portugal after succeeding Count Menendo González, son of Count Gonzalo Menéndez.

He governed as tenant-in-chief part of the territory of Lugo in 910, and in the following year appears as a previsor in Dume. Lucídio was a member of the Curia Regis and as such, confirmed several royal charters between 887 and 917.

Marriage and issue 
He married Gudilona (d. after 915). Her filiation has not been confirmed and historian António Fernandes Almeida believes that she was probably the daughter of Hermenegildo Gutiérrez, although José Mattoso points out that there is no documentary proof sustaining this relationship. Both appear together in 915 donating Fermoselhe to the Cathedral of Coimbra. They were the parents of:

 Tedón Lucídiz
 Vermudo Lucídiz
 Aloyto (or Alvito) Lucídiz, married Munia Dias, daughter of Count Diogo Fernandes and sister of Mumadona Dias. Their son, Lucídio Aloítez was the father of Onega Lucídiz, the second wife of Count Rodrigo Velázquez who was defeated by his rival, Count Gonzalo Menéndez in the Battle of Aguioncha. This Onega (also spelled Onneca) is often confused with her namesake, the wife of the aforementioned count Diogo Fernandes.
 Rodrigo Lucídiz

Notes

References

Bibliography 
 
 
 

920s deaths
Year of birth unknown
Year of death uncertain
Counts of Portugal
County of Portugal
9th-century counts of Portugal (Asturias-León)
10th-century counts of Portugal (Asturias-León)
9th-century Visigothic people
10th-century Visigothic people